

The IAR-831 Pelican is a Romanian trainer aircraft based on the IAR-825 built for the Romanian Air Force. One airframe was built, bearing the civil registration YR-IGA.

Specifications (IAR-831)

References

831